Annapurna is a massif in the Himalayas in north-central Nepal that includes one peak over , thirteen peaks over , and sixteen more over . At the western end, the massif encloses a high basin called the Annapurna Sanctuary. Maurice Herzog led a French expedition to its summit through the north face in 1950, making it the first eight-thousand meter peak ever successfully climbed.

The name for the range comes from the Hindu deity Annapurna meaning the giver of food and nourishment  due to the evergreen flowing rivers originating from this mountain range which generates greenery and supports vegetation year round on the lower plains. She is also believed to be one of the daughters of Himavat, the king of the mountains.

The entire massif and surrounding area are protected within the  Annapurna Conservation Area, the first and largest conservation area in Nepal. The Annapurna Conservation Area is home to several world-class treks, including Annapurna Sanctuary and Annapurna Circuit.

Historically, the Annapurna peaks have been among the world's most treacherous mountains to climb with the particular case of the extremely steep south face of Annapurna I Main – a wall of rock that rises 3,000 metres (9,800 feet) – making it one of the most difficult climbs in the world. By January 2022, there had been 365 summit ascents of Annapurna I Main, and 72 climbing fatalities for a fatality rate of just under 20 percent.

Peaks 
The Annapurna massif contains six prominent peaks over  elevation:

Climbing history 
Gangapurna was first climbed 6 May 1965, by a German expedition led by Günther Hauser, via the East Ridge. The summit party comprised 11 members of the expedition.

Annapurna South (also known as Annapurna Dakshin, or Moditse) was first climbed in 1964 by a Japanese expedition, via the North Ridge. The summit party comprised S. Uyeo and Mingma Tsering.

Hiunchuli (6,441 m/21,126 ft) is a satellite peak extending east from Annapurna South, Hiunchuli was first climbed in 1971 by an expedition led by U.S. Peace Corps Volunteer Craig Anderson.

Mount Machhapuchchhre, named after its resemblance to a fish-tail, is another important peak, though it just misses the 7,000 metre mark. Mount Machhapuchchhre and Hiunchuli are prominently visible from the valley of Pokhara. These peaks are the "gates" to the Annapurna Sanctuary leading to the south face of Annapurna I. Mount Machhapuchchhre was climbed in 1957 (except the final 50 metres for its local religious sanctity) by Wilfrid Noyce and A. D. M. Cox. Since then it has been off limits.

Trekking 
The Annapurna Conservation Area (7,629 km2) is a well known trekking region. There are three major trekking routes in the Annapurna region: the Jomson Trek to Jomsom and Muktinath (increasingly disturbed by a road-building project); the Annapurna Sanctuary route to Annapurna base camp; and the Annapurna Circuit, which circles the Annapurna Himal itself and includes the Jomsom route. The town of Pokhara usually serves as a starting point for these treks, and is also a good starting place for other short treks of one to four days, such as routes to Ghorepani or Ghandruk.

The Mustang district, a former kingdom bordering Tibet, is also geographically a part of the Annapurna region, but treks to upper Mustang are subject to special restrictions. Mustang is also increasingly becoming popular for mountain biking because of the construction of roads undertaken by the Nepali government in the region.

About two-thirds of all trekkers in Nepal visit the Annapurna region. The area is easily accessible, guest houses in the hills are plentiful, and treks here offer incredibly diverse scenery, with both high mountains and lowland villages. Also, because the entire area is inhabited, trekking in the region offers unique cultural exposure and experience. Trekkers are required to purchase a special permit for trekking from the Nepal Immigration Office, with the permit generally being valid for ten days.

2014 trekking disaster 

In October 2014, at least 43 people were killed, and some 175 injured, as a result of snowstorms and avalanches on and around Annapurna, including trekkers from Nepal, Israel, Canada, India, Slovakia and Poland. Between 10 and 50 people were thought likely to be missing.

The authorities were criticized for not giving sufficient warning of the approaching bad weather. By 18 October, some 289 people were reported as having been rescued. The incident was said to be Nepal's worst-ever trekking disaster.

See also
Dhaulagiri (mountain range)

References

Mountain ranges of Nepal